William Hamilton (died 4 December 1717) was a Scottish surgeon, associated with British East India Company (EIC), who travelled to India in the first half of the eighteenth century. He was a part of the delegation that went from Calcutta, the base of the company, to meet Mughal emperor Farrukhsiyar in his court in Delhi in 1715.

Early life
William Hamilton was born in Lanarkshire in the latter part of the seventeenth century, and possibly studied at Glasgow University. He travelled with the East India Company on the Sherborne in 1709, but deserted it at Cuddalore. After finding his way to Madras, he was summoned back to the ship before again absconding to Calcutta.

Treatment of Farrukhsiyar
In Delhi, Hamilton first had to treat Taqarab Khan (the khansama, or lord steward). In August 1715, the surgeon was called to treat a swelling in the groin of the Emperor Farrukhsiyar, which he treated successfully. In October of the same year, the emperor again suffered from violent pain and feared it would be a fistula. Hamilton’s treatment was again successful. As a result, in December 1715 Farrukhsiyar finally arranged his marriage to Indira Kanwar, the daughter of Raja Ajit Singh of Jodhpur, which had been delayed by his recurrent illness.

Royal gift to Hamilton
Hamilton was generously rewarded on the occasion of the wedding. He received "an elephant, a horse, five thousand rupees in money, two diamond rings, a jewelled aigrette, a set of gold buttons, and models of all his instruments in gold."

The Farman
More important than these personal rewards to Hamilton was what the British East India Company achieved. The Company's delegation was placed in high regard in the royal court of Farrukhsiyar. In April 1717, the emperor’s farman (grant) was issued, meeting all the requests that the Company had made in its petitions. Permission was granted to purchase 38 villages surrounding the three already held by the company (Sutanuti, Gobindapur and Kalikata, the predecessor of modern Calcutta). The Company was also granted trading privileges in Bengal and further fortification of Calcutta. This grant was instrumental in the setting up of business and the colonisation of Bengal, later to be followed by the rest of India, by the East India Company.

Farrukhsiyar's wish to retain Hamilton
After the grant, Farrukhsiyar expressed his wish to retain Hamilton in Delhi as his personal physician, but Hamilton was unwilling to stay. Hamilton promised to the emperor that after a visit to Europe he would return and join him as his personal physician.

Death

Hamilton died in Calcutta on [4 December] 1717. He was buried at the churchyard of St. John's Church, Calcutta. The inscription tells the story of his curing a "Malignant Distemper" of Farrukhsiyar.

See also
Gabriel Boughton

References

Further reading
The History Of Bengal, Charles Stewart, Basilisks Press (1813)
“Surgeons in India – Past and Present”, Dodwell and Miles Calcutta Review (1854), Vol.XXIII, pp. 241–243

Year of birth missing
1717 deaths
British surgeons
British people in colonial India
British East India Company people
Mughal Empire people
Military personnel from Kolkata